Parnell Hall is the central building of the campus of the Arkansas School for the Deaf on West Markham Road in Little Rock, Arkansas.  It is a large -story Classical Revival building, designed by Francis, J. Erhart and completed in 1931.  The school has long been the central educational facility for Arkansas's deaf population, with Parnell Hall playing a central role, providing classrooms, administrative facilities, and a large meeting hall.

The building was listed on the National Register of Historic Places in 2008.

See also
National Register of Historic Places listings in Little Rock, Arkansas

References

School buildings on the National Register of Historic Places in Arkansas
Neoclassical architecture in Arkansas
Buildings and structures completed in 1931
Buildings and structures in Little Rock, Arkansas
National Register of Historic Places in Little Rock, Arkansas